Batu Pahat Mall (BP Mall) is a shopping mall in Batu Pahat Town, Batu Pahat District, Johor, Malaysia. The mall is located at Federal Route 50.

Business
The shopping mall consists of 260 retail outlets, most notably POPULAR Bookstores, a bookshop owned by Popular Holdings. The residents of Batu Pahat also frequently visit Paragon Cinemas, one of the two cinemas in the city, the other being MBO Cinemas in the nearby Square One Shopping Mall. The Capcom Station Arcade is where the younger generations often go to.

Popularity among Batu Pahat residents
Batu Pahat Mall, or more commonly known as BP Mall, is a popular hangout spot for the residents of Batu Pahat. Its abundance of shopping outlets and entertainment sources are what attracts the people of Batu Pahat to frequently visit.

Transportation
The shopping mall is accessible by Causeway Link route 8 from Ayer Hitam to Batu Pahat Town.

See also 
 Batu Pahat
 Bandar Penggaram, Batu Pahat

References

Batu Pahat District
Shopping malls in Johor